The Lord's Prayer, also called the Our Father or Pater Noster, is a central Christian prayer which Jesus taught as the way to pray. Two versions of this prayer are recorded in the gospels: a longer form within the Sermon on the Mount in the Gospel of Matthew, and a shorter form in the Gospel of Luke when "one of his disciples said to him, 'Lord, teach us to pray, as John taught his disciples. Regarding the presence of the two versions, some have suggested that both were original, the Matthean version spoken by Jesus early in his ministry in Galilee, and the Lucan version one year later, "very likely in Judea".

The first three of the seven petitions in Matthew address God; the other four are related to human needs and concerns. Matthew's account alone includes the "Your will be done" and the "Rescue us from the evil one" (or "Deliver us from evil") petitions. Both original Greek texts contain the adjective epiousion; while controversial, "daily" has been the most common English-language translation of this word.

Initial words on the topic from the Catechism of the Catholic Church teach that it "is truly the summary of the whole gospel". The prayer is used by most Christian denominations in their worship and with few exceptions, the liturgical form is the version from the gospel of Matthew. Protestants usually conclude the prayer with a doxology (in some versions, "For thine is the kingdom, the power and the glory, for ever and ever, Amen"), a later addition appearing in some manuscripts of Matthew. Although theological differences and various modes of worship divide Christians, according to Fuller Seminary professor Clayton Schmit, "there is a sense of solidarity in knowing that Christians around the globe are praying together ... and these words always unite us."

Texts

New Revised Standard Version

Relationship between the Matthaean and Lucan texts
In biblical criticism, the absence of the Lord's Prayer in the Gospel of Mark, together with its occurrence in Matthew and Luke, has caused scholars who accept the two-source hypothesis (against other document hypotheses) to conclude that it is probably a logion original to the Q source. The common source of the two existing versions, whether Q or an oral or another written tradition, was elaborated differently in the Gospels of Matthew and Luke.

Marianus Pale Hera considers it unlikely that either of the two used the other as its source and that it is possible that they "preserve two versions of the Lord’s Prayer used in two different communities: the Matthean in a Jewish Christian community and the Lucan in the Gentile Christian community".

If either evangelist built on the other, Joachim Jeremias attributes priority to Luke on the grounds that "in the early period, before wordings were fixed, liturgical texts were elaborated, expanded and enriched". On the other hand, Michael Goulder, Thomas J. Mosbo and Ken Olson see the shorter Lucan version as a reworking of the Matthaean text, removing unnecessary verbiage and repetition.

The Matthaean version has completely ousted the Lucan in general Christian usage, The following considerations are based on the Matthaean version.

Original Greek text and Syriac and Latin translations

Standard edition of Greek text

Standard edition of Syriac text of Peshitta

1. 
(ʾăḇūn d-ḇa-šmayyā)

2. 
(neṯqaddaš šmāḵ)

3. 
(têṯē malkūṯāḵ)

4. 
(nēhwē ṣeḇyānāḵ ʾaykannā ḏ-ḇa-šmayyā ʾāp̄ b-ʾarʿā)

5. 
(haḇ lan laḥmā ḏ-sūnqānan yawmānā)

6. 
(wa-šḇoq lan ḥawbayn ʾaykannā ḏ-ʾāp̄ ḥnan šḇaqn l-ḥayyāḇayn)

7. 
(w-lā ṯaʿlan l-nesyōnā ʾellā p̄aṣṣān men bīšā)

Vulgata Clementina (1692)

1. pater noster qui es in cælis

2. sanctificetur nomen tuum

3. adveniat regnum tuum

4. fiat voluntas tua sicut in cælo et in terra

5. panem nostrum supersubstantialem da nobis hodie

6. et dimitte nobis debita nostra sicut et nos dimittimus debitoribus nostris

7. et ne nos inducas in tentationem sed libera nos a malo

Liturgical texts: Greek, Syriac, Latin

Patriarchal Edition 1904

,
,
,
.

.
.

Syriac liturgical

(our father who art in heaven)

(hallowed be thy name)

(thy kingdom come)

(thy will be done as it is in heaven also on earth)

(give us the bread of our need this day)

(and forgive us our debts and our sins as we have forgiven our debtors)

(and bring us not into temptation but deliver us from evil)

(for thine is the kingdom the power the glory for an age of ages amen)

Roman Missal
Pater noster qui es in cælis:
sanctificétur nomen tuum;
advéniat regnum tuum;
fiat volúntas tua, sicut in cælo, et in terra.
Panem nostrum cotidiánum da nobis hódie;
et dimítte nobis débita nostra,
sicut et nos dimíttimus debitóribus nostris;
et ne nos indúcas in tentatiónem;
sed líbera nos a malo.

Greek texts

English versions

There are several different English translations of the Lord's Prayer from Greek or Latin, beginning around AD 650 with the Northumbrian translation. Of those in current liturgical use, the three best-known are:
 The translation in the 1662 Book of Common Prayer of the Church of England
 The slightly modernized "traditional ecumenical" form used in the Catholic and (often with doxology) many Protestant Churches
 The 1988 translation of the ecumenical English Language Liturgical Consultation (ELLC)
The concluding doxology ("For thine is the kingdom and the power, and the glory, for ever and ever. Amen") is often added at the end of the prayer by Protestants. The 1662 Book of Common Prayer (BCP) adds doxology in some of the services, but not in all. For example, the doxology is not used in the 1662 BCP at Morning and Evening Prayer when it is preceded by the Kyrie eleison. Older English translations of the Bible, based on late Byzantine Greek manuscripts, included it, but it is excluded in critical editions of the New Testament, such as that of the United Bible Societies. It is absent in the oldest manuscripts and is not considered to be part of the original text of Matthew 6:9–13.

In the Byzantine Rite, whenever a priest is officiating, after the Lord's Prayer he intones this augmented form of the doxology, "For thine is the kingdom and the power and the glory: of the Father, and of the Son, and of the Holy Spirit, now and ever, and unto ages of ages.", and in either instance, reciter(s) of the prayer reply "Amen".

The Catholic Latin liturgical rites have never attached the doxology to the end of the Lord's Prayer. The doxology does appear in the Roman Rite Mass as revised in 1969. After the conclusion of the Lord's Prayer, the priest says a prayer known as the embolism. In the official International Commission on English in the Liturgy (ICEL) English translation, the embolism reads: "Deliver us, Lord, we pray, from every evil, graciously grant peace in our days, that, by the help of your mercy, we may be always free from sin and safe from all distress, as we await the blessed hope and the coming of our Saviour, Jesus Christ." This elaborates on the final petition, "Deliver us from evil." The people then respond to this with the doxology: "For the kingdom, the power, and the glory are yours, now and forever."

The translators of the 1611 King James Bible assumed that a Greek manuscript they possessed was ancient and therefore adopted the phrase "For thine is the kingdom, the power, and the glory for ever" into the Lord's Prayer of Matthew's Gospel. However, the use of the doxology in English dates from at least 1549 with the First Prayer Book of Edward VI which was influenced by William Tyndale's New Testament translation in 1526. Later scholarship demonstrated that inclusion of the doxology in New Testament manuscripts was actually a later addition based in part on Eastern liturgical tradition.

1662 Anglican BCP

Our Father, which art in heaven,
Hallowed be thy Name;
Thy kingdom come;
Thy will be done
in earth, as it is in heaven:
Give us this day our daily bread;
And forgive us our trespasses,
as we forgive them that trespass against us;
And lead us not into temptation,
But deliver us from evil;
For thine is the kingdom,
the power, and the glory,
For ever and ever.
Amen.

Traditional Ecumenical Version

Our Father, who art in heaven,
hallowed be thy name;
thy kingdom come,
thy will be done
on earth as it is in heaven.
Give us this day our daily bread,
and forgive us our trespasses,
as we forgive those who trespass against us;
and lead us not into temptation,
but deliver us from evil.

Most Protestants conclude with the doxology:
For thine is the kingdom,
and the power, and the glory,
for ever and ever. Amen. (or ...forever. Amen.)

At Mass in the Catholic Church the embolism is followed by:
For the kingdom,
the power and the glory are yours,
now and for ever.

1988 ELLC
Our Father in heaven,
hallowed be your name,
your kingdom come,
your will be done,
on earth as in heaven.
Give us today our daily bread.
Forgive us our sins
as we forgive those who sin against us.
Save us from the time of trial
and deliver us from evil.
For the kingdom, the power, and the glory are yours
now and for ever. Amen.

King James Version

Although Matthew 6:12 uses the term debts, most older English versions of the Lord's Prayer use the term trespasses, while ecumenical versions often use the term sins. The last choice may be due to Luke 11:4, which uses the word sins, while the former may be due to Matthew 6:14 (immediately after the text of the prayer), where Jesus speaks of trespasses. As early as the third century, Origen of Alexandria used the word trespasses in the prayer. Although the Latin form that was traditionally used in Western Europe has debita (debts), most English-speaking Christians (except Scottish Presbyterians and some others of the Dutch Reformed tradition) use trespasses. For example, the Church of Scotland, the Presbyterian Church (U.S.A.), the Reformed Church in America, as well as some Congregational heritage churches in the United Church of Christ follow the version found in Matthew 6 in the King James Version, which in the prayer uses the words debts and debtors.

King James Version (1611)
Our father which art in heaven,
hallowed be thy name.
Thy kingdome come.
Thy will be done, in earth,
as it is in heaven.
Give us this day our daily bread. 
And forgive us our debts,
as we forgive our debters.
And lead us not into temptation,
but deliver us from evil:
For thine is the kingdom,
and the power, and the glory,
for ever, Amen.

Slightly Modernized AV/KJV Version
Our Father, who art in heaven, 
Hallowed be thy name.
Thy kingdom come,
Thy will be done on earth, 
as it is in heaven. 
Give us this day our daily bread. 
And forgive us our debts, 
as we forgive our debtors. 
And lead us not into temptation,
but deliver us from evil:
For thine is the kingdom,
and the power, and the glory,
forever. Amen.

All these versions are based on the text in Matthew, rather than Luke, of the prayer given by Jesus:

Matthew 6:9–13 (ESV)

"Pray then like this: 'Our Father in heaven, hallowed be your name. Your kingdom come, your will be done, on earth as it is in heaven. Give us this day our daily bread, and forgive us our debts, as we also have forgiven our debtors. And lead us not into temptation, but deliver us from evil.

Luke 11:2–4 (ESV)

And he said to them, "When you pray, say: 'Father, hallowed be your name. Your kingdom come. Give us each day our daily bread, and forgive us our sins, for we ourselves forgive everyone who is indebted to us. And lead us not into temptation.

Analysis

Saint Augustine of Hippo gives the following analysis of the Lord's Prayer, which elaborates on Jesus' words just before it in Matthew's Gospel: "Your Father knows what you need before you ask him. Pray then in this way" (Mt. 6:8–9):This excerpt from Augustine is included in the Office of Readings in the Catholic Liturgy of the Hours.

Many have written biblical commentaries on the Lord's Prayer. Contained below are a variety of selections from some of those commentaries.

Introduction
This subheading and those that follow use 1662 Book of Common Prayer (BCP) (see above)
"Our" indicates that the prayer is that of a group of people who consider themselves children of God and who call God their "Father". "In heaven" indicates that the Father who is addressed is distinct from human fathers on earth.

Augustine interpreted "heaven" (coelum, sky) in this context as meaning "in the hearts of the righteous, as it were in His holy temple".

First Petition

Former archbishop of Canterbury Rowan Williams explains this phrase as a petition that people may look upon God's name as holy, as something that inspires awe and reverence, and that they may not trivialize it by making God a tool for their purposes, to "put other people down, or as a sort of magic to make themselves feel safe". He sums up the meaning of the phrase by saying: "Understand what you're talking about when you're talking about God, this is serious, this is the most wonderful and frightening reality that we could imagine, more wonderful and frightening than we can imagine."

Richard Challoner writes that: "this petition hold the primary place in the Lord's prayer, because the first and principal duty of a Christian is, to love his God with his whole heart and soul, and therefore the first and principal thing he should desire and pray for is, the great honor and glory of God."

Second Petition

"This petition has its parallel in the Jewish prayer, 'May he establish his Kingdom during your life and during your days. In the gospels Jesus speaks frequently of God's kingdom, but never defines the concept: "He assumed this was a concept so familiar that it did not require definition." Concerning how Jesus' audience in the gospels would have understood him, G. E. Ladd turns to the concept's Hebrew biblical background: "The Hebrew word malkuth […] refers first to a reign, dominion, or rule and only secondarily to the realm over which a reign is exercised. […] When malkuth is used of God, it almost always refers to his authority or to his rule as the heavenly King." This petition looks to the perfect establishment of God's rule in the world in the future, an act of God resulting in the eschatological order of the new age.

The Catholic Church believes that, by praying the Lord's prayer, a Christian hastens the Second Coming. Like the church, some denominations see the coming of God's kingdom as a divine gift to be prayed for, not a human achievement. Others believe that the Kingdom will be fostered by the hands of those faithful who work for a better world. These believe that Jesus' commands to feed the hungry and clothe the needy make the seeds of the kingdom already present on earth (Lk 8:5–15; Mt 25:31–40).

Hilda C. Graef notes that the operative Greek word, basileia, means both kingdom and kingship (i.e., reign, dominion, governing, etc.), but that the English word kingdom loses this double meaning. Kingship adds a psychological meaning to the petition: one is also praying for the condition of soul where one follows God's will.

Richard Challoner, commenting on this petition, notes that the kingdom of God can be understood in three ways: 1) of the eternal kingdom of God in heaven. 2) of the spiritual kingdom of Christ, in his Church upon earth. 3) of the mystical kingdom of God, in our souls, according to the words of Christ, "The kingdom of God is within you" (Luke 17:21).

Third Petition

According to William Barclay, this phrase is a couplet with the same meaning as "Thy kingdom come." Barclay argues: "The kingdom is a state of things on earth in which God's will is as perfectly done as it is in heaven. ...To do the will of God and to be in the Kingdom of God are one and the same thing."

John Ortberg interprets this phrase as follows: "Many people think our job is to get my afterlife destination taken care of, then tread water till we all get ejected and God comes back and torches this place. But Jesus never told anybody – neither his disciples nor us – to pray, 'Get me out of here so I can go up there.' His prayer was, 'Make up there come down here.' Make things down here run the way they do up there." The request that "thy will be done" is God's invitation to "join him in making things down here the way they are up there."

Fourth Petition

As mentioned earlier, the original word  (epiousion), commonly characterized as daily, is unique to the Lord's Prayer in all of ancient Greek literature. The word is almost a hapax legomenon, occurring only in Luke and Matthew's versions of the Lord's Prayer, and nowhere else in any other extant Greek texts. While epiousion is often substituted by the word "daily," all other New Testament translations from the Greek into "daily" otherwise reference hemeran (ἡμέραν, "the day"), which does not appear in this usage.

Jerome by linguistic parsing  translated "ἐπιούσιον" (epiousion) as "supersubstantialem" in the Gospel of Matthew, but as "cotidianum" ("daily") in the Gospel of Luke. This wide-ranging difference with respect to meaning of epiousion is discussed in detail in the current Catechism of the Catholic Church in an inclusive approach toward tradition as well as a literal one for meaning: "Taken in a temporal sense, this word is a pedagogical repetition of 'this day', to confirm us in trust 'without reservation'. Taken in the qualitative sense, it signifies what is necessary for life, and more broadly every good thing sufficient for subsistence. Taken literally (epi-ousios: 'super-essential'), it refers directly to the Bread of Life, the Body of Christ, the 'medicine of immortality,' without which we have no life within us."

Epiousion is translated as supersubstantialem in the Vulgate Matthew 6:11 and accordingly as supersubstantial in the Douay–Rheims Bible Matthew 6:11.

Barclay M. Newman's A Concise Greek-English Dictionary of the New Testament, published in a revised edition in 2010 by the United Bible Societies, has the following entry:

It thus derives the word from the preposition ἐπί (epi) and the verb εἰμί (eimi), from the latter of which are derived words such as οὐσία (ousia), the range of whose meanings is indicated in A Greek–English Lexicon.

Fifth Petition

The Presbyterian and other Reformed churches tend to use the rendering "forgive us our debts, as we forgive our debtors". Roman Catholics, Lutherans, Anglicans and Methodists are more likely to say "trespasses… those who trespass against us". The "debts" form appears in the first English translation of the Bible, by John Wycliffe in 1395 (Wycliffe spelling "dettis"). The "trespasses" version appears in the 1526 translation by William Tyndale (Tyndale spelling "treaspases"). In 1549 the first Book of Common Prayer in English used a version of the prayer with "trespasses". This became the "official" version used in Anglican congregations. On the other hand, the 1611 King James Version, the version specifically authorized for the Church of England, has "forgive us our debts, as we forgive our debtors".

After the request for bread, Matthew and Luke diverge slightly. Matthew continues with a request for debts to be forgiven in the same manner as people have forgiven those who have debts against them. Luke, on the other hand, makes a similar request about sins being forgiven in the manner of debts being forgiven between people. The word "debts" does not necessarily mean financial obligations, as shown by the use of the verbal form of the same word in passages such as Romans 13:8. The Aramaic word ḥôbâ can mean "debt" or "sin". This difference between Luke's and Matthew's wording could be explained by the original form of the prayer having been in Aramaic. The generally accepted interpretation is thus that the request is for forgiveness of sin, not of supposed loans granted by God. Asking for forgiveness from God was a staple of Jewish prayers (e.g., Penitential Psalms). It was also considered proper for individuals to be forgiving of others, so the sentiment expressed in the prayer would have been a common one of the time.

Anthony C. Deane, Canon of Worcester Cathedral, suggested that the choice of the word "ὀφειλήματα" (debts), rather than "ἁμαρτίας" (sins), indicates a reference to failures to use opportunities of doing good. He linked this with the parable of the sheep and the goats (also in Matthew's Gospel), in which the grounds for condemnation are not wrongdoing in the ordinary sense, but failure to do right, missing opportunities for showing love to others.

"As we forgive ...". Divergence between Matthew's "debts" and Luke's "sins" is relatively trivial compared to the impact of the second half of this statement. The verses immediately following the Lord's Prayer, Matthew 6:14–15 show Jesus teaching that the forgiveness of our sin/debt (by God) is linked with how we forgive others, as in the Parable of the Unforgiving Servant Matthew 18:23–35, which Matthew gives later. R. T. France comments:

Sixth Petition

Interpretations of the penultimate petition of the prayer – not to be led by God into peirasmos – vary considerably. The range of meanings of the Greek word "πειρασμός" (peirasmos) is illustrated in New Testament Greek lexicons. In different contexts it can mean temptation, testing, trial, experiment. Although the traditional English translation uses the word "temptation" and Carl Jung saw God as actually leading people astray, Christians generally interpret the petition as not contradicting James 1:13–14: "Let no one say when he is tempted, 'I am being tempted by God', for God cannot be tempted with evil, and he himself tempts no one. But each person is tempted when he is lured and enticed by his own desire." Some see the petition as an eschatological appeal against unfavourable Last Judgment, a theory supported by the use of the word "peirasmos" in this sense in Revelation 3:10. Others see it as a plea against hard tests described elsewhere in scripture, such as those of Job. It is also read as: "Do not let us be led (by ourselves, by others, by Satan) into temptations". Since it follows shortly after a plea for daily bread (i.e., material sustenance), it is also seen as referring to not being caught up in the material pleasures given. A similar phrase appears in Matthew 26:41 and Luke 22:40 in connection with the prayer of Jesus in Gethsemane.

Joseph Smith, the founder of the Latter Day Saint movement, in a version of the Holy Bible which was not published before his death, used: "And suffer us not to be led into temptation".

In a conversation on the Italian TV channel TV2000 on 6 December 2017, Pope Francis commented that the then Italian wording of this petition (similar to the traditional English) was a poor translation. He said "the French" (i.e., the Bishops' Conference of France) had changed the petition to "Do not let us fall in/into temptation". He was referring to the 2017 change to a new French version, Et ne nous laisse pas entrer en tentation ("Do not let us enter into temptation"), but spoke of it in terms of the Spanish translation, no nos dejes caer en la tentación ("do not let us fall in/into temptation"), that he was accustomed to recite in Argentina before his election as Pope. He explained: "I am the one who falls; it's not him [God] pushing me into temptation to then see how I have fallen". Anglican theologian Ian Paul said that such a proposal was "stepping into a theological debate about the nature of evil".

In January 2018, after "in-depth study", the German Bishops' Conference rejected any rewording of their translation of the Lord's Prayer.

In November 2018, the Episcopal Conference of Italy adopted a new edition of the Messale Romano, the Italian translation of the Roman Missal. One of the changes made from the older (1983) edition was to render this petition as non abbandonarci alla tentazione ("do not abandon us to temptation"). This was approved by Pope Francis, however there are no current plans to make a similar change for the English translation as of 2019.The Italian-speaking Union of Methodist and Waldensian Churches maintains its translation of the petition: non esporci alla tentazione ("do not expose us to temptation").

Seventh Petition

Translations and scholars are divided over whether the final word here refers to "evil" in general or "the evil one" (the devil) in particular. In the original Greek, as well as in the Latin translation, the word could be either of neuter (evil in general) or masculine (the evil one) gender. Matthew's version of the prayer appears in the Sermon on the Mount, in earlier parts of which the term is used to refer to general evil. Later parts of Matthew refer to the devil when discussing similar issues. However, the devil is never referred to as the evil one in any known Aramaic sources. While John Calvin accepted the vagueness of the term's meaning, he considered that there is little real difference between the two interpretations, and that therefore the question is of no real consequence. Similar phrases are found in John 17:15 and Thessalonians 3:3.

Doxology

Content
The doxology sometimes attached to the prayer in English is similar to a passage in 1 Chronicles 29:11 – "Yours, O LORD, is the greatness and the power and the glory and the victory and the majesty, for all that is in the heavens and in the earth is yours. Yours is the kingdom, O LORD, and you are exalted as head above all." It is also similar to the paean to King Nebuchadnezzar of Babylon in Daniel 2:37 – "You, O king, the king of kings, to whom the God of heaven has given the kingdom, the power, and the might, and the glory".

The doxology has been interpreted as connected with the final petition: "Deliver us from evil". The kingdom, the power and the glory are the Father's, not of our antagonist's, who is subject to him to whom Christ will hand over the kingdom after he has destroyed all dominion, authority and power (1 Corinthians 15:24). It makes the prayer end as well as begin with the vision of God in heaven, in the majesty of his name and kingdom and the perfection of his will and purpose.

Origin
The doxology is not included in Luke's version of the Lord's Prayer, nor is it present in the earliest manuscripts (papyrus or parchment) of Matthew, representative of the Alexandrian text, although it is present in the manuscripts representative of the later Byzantine text. Most scholars do not consider it part of the original text of Matthew. The Codex Washingtonianus, which adds a doxology (in the familiar text), is of the early fifth or late fourth century. New translations generally omit it except as a footnote.

The Didache, generally considered a first-century text, has a doxology, "for yours is the power and the glory forever", as a conclusion for the Lord's Prayer (Didache, 8:2). C. Clifton Black, although regarding the Didache as an "early second century" text, nevertheless considers the doxology it contains to be the "earliest additional ending we can trace". Of a longer version, Black observes: "Its earliest appearance may have been in Tatian's Diatessaron, a second-century harmony of the four Gospels". The first three editions of the United Bible Societies text cited the Diatessaron for inclusion of the familiar doxology in Matthew 6:13, but in the later editions it cites the Diatessaron for excluding it. The Apostolic Constitutions added "the kingdom" to the beginning of the formula in the Didache, thus establishing the now familiar doxology.

Varied liturgical use
In the Byzantine Rite, whenever a priest is officiating, after the last line of the prayer he intones the doxology, "For thine is the kingdom and the power and the glory: of the Father, and of the Son, and of the Holy Spirit, now and ever, and unto ages of ages.", and in either instance, reciter(s) of the prayer reply "Amen".

Adding a doxology to the Our Father is not part of the liturgical tradition of the Roman Rite nor does the Latin Vulgate of St. Jerome contain the doxology that appears in late Greek manuscripts. However, it is recited since 1970 in the Roman Rite Order of Mass, not as part of the Lord's Prayer but separately as a response acclamation after the embolism developing the seventh petition in the perspective of the Final Coming of Christ.

In most Anglican editions of the Book of Common Prayer, the Lord's Prayer ends with the doxology unless it is preceded by the Kyrie eleison. This happens at the daily offices of Morning Prayer (Mattins) and Evening Prayer (Evensong) and in a few other offices. 

The vast majority of Protestant churches conclude the Lord's Prayer with the doxology.

Use as a language comparison tool

In the course of Christianization, one of the first texts to be translated between many languages has historically been the Lord's Prayer, long before the full Bible would be translated into the respective languages. Since the 16th century, collections of translations of the prayer have often been used for a quick comparison of languages. The first such collection, with 22 versions, was Mithridates, de differentiis linguarum by Conrad Gessner (1555; the title refers to Mithridates VI of Pontus who according to Pliny the Elder was an exceptional polyglot).

Gessner's idea of collecting translations of the prayer was taken up by authors of the 17th century, including Hieronymus Megiserus (1603) and Georg Pistorius (1621). Thomas Lüdeken in 1680 published an enlarged collection of 83 versions of the prayer, of which three were in fictional philosophical languages.
Lüdeken quotes as a Barnum Hagius as his source for the exotic scripts used, while their true (anonymous) author was Andreas Müller.
In 1700, Lüdeken's collection was re-edited by B. Mottus as Oratio dominica plus centum linguis versionibus aut characteribus reddita et expressa.
This edition was comparatively inferior, but a second, revised edition was published in 1715 by John Chamberlain.
This 1715 edition was used by Gottfried Hensel in his Synopsis Universae Philologiae (1741) to compile "geographico-polyglot maps" where the beginning of the prayer was shown in the geographical area where the respective languages were spoken.
Johann Ulrich Kraus also published a collection with more than 100 entries.

These collections continued to be improved and expanded well into the 19th century; Johann Christoph Adelung and Johann Severin Vater in 1806–1817 published the prayer in "well-nigh five hundred languages and dialects".

Samples of scripture, including the Lord's Prayer, were published in 52 oriental languages, most of them not previously found in such collections, translated by the brethren of the Serampore Mission and printed at the mission press there in 1818.

Comparisons with other prayer traditions
The book The Comprehensive New Testament, by T.E. Clontz and J. Clontz, points to similarities between elements of the Lord's Prayer and expressions in writings of other religions as diverse as the Dhammapada, the Epic of Gilgamesh, the Golden Verses, and the Egyptian Book of the Dead. It mentions in particular parallels in 1 Chronicles.

Rabbi Aron Mendes Chumaceiro says that nearly all the elements of the prayer have counterparts in the Jewish Bible and Deuterocanonical books: the first part in Isaiah 63 ("Look down from heaven and see, from your holy and beautiful habitation… for you are our Father") and Ezekiel 36 ("I will vindicate the holiness of my great name…") and 38 ("I will show my greatness and my holiness and make myself known in the eyes of many nations…"), the second part in Obadiah 1 ("Saviours shall go up to Mount Zion to rule Mount Esau, and the kingdom shall be the LORD's") and 1 Samuel 3 ("…It is the LORD. Let him do what seems good to him."), the third part in Proverbs 30 ("…feed me with my apportioned bread…"), the fourth part in Sirach 28 ("Forgive your neighbour the wrong he has done, and then your sins will be pardoned when you pray."). "Deliver us from evil" can be compared with Psalm 119 ("…let no iniquity get dominion over me.").

Chumaceiro says that, because the idea of God leading a human into temptation contradicts the righteousness and love of God, "Lead us not into temptation" has no counterpart in the Jewish Bible/Christian Old Testament. However, the word "πειρασμός", which is translated as "temptation", can also be translated as "test" or "trial", making evident the attitude of someone's heart, and in the Old Testament God tested Abraham, and told David, "Go, number Israel and Judah," an action that David later acknowledged as sin; and the testing of Job in the Book of Job.

Reuben Bredenhof says that the various petitions of the Lord's Prayer, as well as the doxology attached to it, have a conceptual and thematic background in the Old Testament Book of Psalms.

On the other hand, Andrew Wommack says that the Lord's Prayer "technically speaking… isn't even a true New Testament prayer".

In post-biblical Jewish prayer, especially Kiddushin 81a (Babylonian). "Our Father which art in heaven" (אבינו שבשמים, Avinu shebashamayim) is the beginning of many Hebrew prayers. "Hallowed be thy name" is reflected in the Kaddish.  "Lead us not into sin" is echoed in the "morning blessings" of Jewish prayer. A blessing said by some Jewish communities after the evening Shema includes a phrase quite similar to the opening of the Lord's Prayer: "Our God in heaven, hallow thy name, and establish thy kingdom forever, and rule over us for ever and ever. Amen."

In popular culture
As with other prayers, the Lord's Prayer was used by cooks to time their recipes before the spread of clocks. For example, a step could be "simmer the broth for three Lord's Prayers".

American songwriter and arranger Brian Wilson set the text of the Lord's Prayer to an elaborate close-harmony arrangement loosely based on Malotte's melody. Wilson's group, The Beach Boys, would return to the piece several times throughout their recording career, most notably as the B-side to their 1964 single "Little Saint Nick." The band Yazoo used the prayer interspersed with the lyrics of "In My Room" on the album Upstairs at Eric's.

Images

See also

Al-Fatiha
 Amen
 Church of the Pater Noster on the Mount of Olives, Jerusalem
 Discourse on ostentation, a portion of the Sermon on the Mount
 Five Discourses of Matthew
 Hail Mary
 High Priestly Prayer
 Prayer in the New Testament
 Rosary
 Didache, an early book of rituals which mentions saying the prayer three times daily
 Novum Testamentum Graece, the primary source for most contemporary New Testament translations
 Textus Receptus
 List of New Testament verses not included in modern English translations

Notes

References

Citations

Sources

 Albright, W.F. and C.S. Mann. "Matthew." The Anchor Bible Series. New York: Doubleday & Co., 1971.
 Augsburger, Myron. Matthew. Waco, Texas: Word Books, 1982.
 Barclay, William. The Gospel of Matthew: Volume 1 Chapters 1–10. Edinburgh: Saint Andrew Press, 1975.
 Beare, Francis Wright. The Gospel According to Matthew. Oxford: B. Blackwell, 1981.
 

 Brown, Raymond E. The Pater Noster as an Eschatological Prayer, article in Theological Studies (1961) Vol. 22, pp. 175–208: from the website of Marquette University; also reprinted in New Testament Essays (1965)
 Clark, D. The Lord's Prayer. Origins and Early Interpretations (Studia Traditionis Theologiae, 21) Turnhout: Brepols Publishers, 2016, 
 

 Filson, Floyd V. A Commentary on the Gospel According to St. Matthew. London: A. & C. Black, 1960.
 Fowler, Harold. The Gospel of Matthew: Volume One. Joplin: College Press, 1968
 France, R.T. The Gospel According to Matthew: an Introduction and Commentary. Leicester: Inter-Varsity, 1985.
 Hendriksen, William. The Gospel of Matthew. Edinburgh: Banner of Truth Trust, 1976
 Hill, David. The Gospel of Matthew. Grand Rapids: Eerdmans, 1981
 
 "Lilies in the Field." A Dictionary of Biblical Tradition in English Literature. David Lyle Jeffrey, general editor. Grand Rapids: W.B. Eerdmans, 1992.
 Lewis, Jack P. The Gospel According to Matthew. Austin, Texas: R.B. Sweet, 1976.
 Luz, Ulrich. Matthew 1–7: A Commentary. trans. Wilhlem C. Linss. Minneapolis: Augsburg Fortress, 1989.
 Morris, Leon. The Gospel According to Matthew. Grand Rapids: W.B. Eerdmans, 1992.
 
 
 Schweizer, Eduard. The Good News According to Matthew. Atlanta: John Knox Press, 1975
 Underhill, Evelyn, Abba. A meditation on the Lord's Prayer (1940); reprint 2003.

External links

Text 
 Pater Noster : a chirographic opus in one hundred and twenty-six languages, by Z. W. Wolkowski
 Learning the Lord’s Prayer in Gothic, by Robert Oliphant
 the Lord’s Prayer in Aramaic
The Lord's Prayer in different languages

Commentary 
 Jewish Encyclopedia
 Max Heindel: Rosicrucian view
 Jehovah's Witnesses view
 Rudolf Steiner lecture

Music 
 

 
Biblical phrases
Christian prayer
Gospel of Matthew
Language comparison
Rosary
Sayings of Jesus
Sermon on the Mount